Claire Préaux (1904–1979) was a professor at the Université Libre de Bruxelles. In 1933, she was engaged by the Brooklyn Museum to translate the Greek ostrachæ of the Wilbour Collection. In 1953 she was awarded the Francqui Prize on Human Sciences for "Philologie classique".

References

External links
 Claire Préaux (biography, French)

Academic staff of the Université libre de Bruxelles
Belgian philologists
Walloon people
1904 births
1979 deaths
Corresponding Fellows of the British Academy